During the 1978–79 English football season, West Bromwich Albion F.C. competed in the Football League First Division. The club enjoyed their highest league finish since 1953–54 when they were runners-up.

Season summary
West Bromwich Albion enjoyed one of their finest seasons to date during Ron Atkinson's first season in charge of the Midlanders, finishing in third place – nine points behind champions Liverpool – to qualify for the UEFA Cup. Integral to Albion's success were the "Three Degrees", Brendan Batson, Laurie Cunningham and Cyrille Regis, but Cunningham left at the end of the season to join Spanish side Real Madrid. The season was also memorable for club legend Tony "The Bomber" Brown as the goal he scored in a 2–1 defeat against Leeds United in February was his 209th Football League goal for the club, overtaking Ronnie Allen's club record in the process.

Albion made two big money signings during the course of the season, bringing in David Mills from Middlesbrough in January 1979 for a club record £516,000. Mills however struggled to get into the team and when he left the club for Sheffield Wednesday in 1983 it was for half a million pounds less than Albion had paid for him. Willie Johnston, who had been sent home from the 1978 FIFA World Cup after failing a drug test, left the club for Vancouver Whitecaps on a £100,000 deal.

Albion's form the previous season had meant that they had qualified for the UEFA Cup and it proved a comparatively successful campaign in Europe for the club. Albion reached the quarter finals, having defeated Galatasaray, Braga and Valencia before losing to Red Star Belgrade. Albion had reached the quarter finals of the 1968–69 European Cup Winners' Cup but this season represented the first occasion on which they had successfully negotiated three rounds of a European competition in one season.

Cunningham, Regis and Derek Statham were named in the First Division PFA Team of the Year.

Kit
West Bromwich Albion's kit was manufactured by English company Umbro.

Squad

Sources:
Key:
Pos = position in which player generally featured
GK = goalkeeper
DF = defender
MF = midfielder
FW = Forward
FL = Football League
FAC = FA Cup
FLC = Football League Cup
UEFA = UEFA Cup
apps = appearances in competition
goals = goals scored in competition

Results

First Division

source:

FA Cup
(25,755)

Source:

League Cup

NB: The second replay was held at the neutral venue of Maine Road.

UEFA Cup

Source:

Friendlies
 21 February: West Bromwich Albion 0–0 Nottingham Forest

References

West Bromwich Albion F.C. seasons
West Bromwich Albion F.C.